Saara is a female given name in Finland and Estonia, derived from the biblical name Sarah. Its nameday is celebrated on the 19th of July. As of 2012, almost 20,000 people in Finland have this name. It was most popular in the 1980s and the 1990s.

Notable people
 Saara Aalto (born 1987), Finnish singer
 Saara Chaudry (born 2004), Canadian actress
 Saara Deva (born 1994), Indian actress 
 Saara Forsberg (born 1994), Finnish singer-songwriter
 Saara Kuugongelwa (born 1967), Prime Minister of Namibia
 Saara Lamberg, Finnish actress 
 Sara Mustonen (born 1981), Swedish racing cyclist
 Saara Orav (born 2001), Estonian tennis player
 Saara Pius (born 1990), Estonian actress and singer
 Saara Ranin (1898–1992), Finnish actress and director
 Saara Tuominen (born 1986), Finnish ice hockey player

References

Finnish feminine given names
Estonian feminine given names